Harriet E. Grim was an American suffragist. She was known for being a skilled orator. She traveled through the midwest urging states to adopt their own equal suffrage amendments.

Early life and education 
Grim attended high school in Canton, Illinois. She entered college in 1904. Around 1907, she traveled to Europe to study the women's suffrage movement.

Career

Suffragist 
By her early twenties, Grim had already gained national attention for her work advocating for equal suffrage. She pushed the Republican Party to include an equal suffrage plank in its platform. An Iowa newspaper at the time credited Grim's oratory skills along with her youth and beauty for bringing support to the plank.

When the Illinois state senate passed its equal suffrage bill in 1911, Grim was the only woman present. Grim worked for Wisconsin to pass a state suffrage amendment in 1912. She spent a year leading up to the vote traveling the state giving public speeches. In 1914 she traveled to North Dakota to give speeches and urge the passage of a state suffrage amendment there.

Later career 
Grim later became a school principal in Darlington, Wisconsin. In 1927 she was appointed to the Wisconsin State Board of Control.

References 

American suffragists
20th-century American women
Year of birth missing
Year of death missing
20th-century American people